"Spirits (Having Flown)" is a song by the Bee Gees which was originally released on the 1979 album Spirits Having Flown. Though not issued as a single in conjunction with the parent album, it was released in the UK to promote the compilation Bee Gees Greatest, which was released in December 1979. Its B-side was a 1975 song "Wind of Change" from the group's Main Course.

The song itself is a Caribbean flavored R&B track sung by Barry in natural voice during the verses and joined by Robin and Maurice on the chorus which is sung in falsetto. The count-in (1, 2, 3, 4) heard on the album version was omitted from the single version and on the album Bee Gees Greatest. Flute work for the track was provided by Herbie Mann. A promotional video of the song, presenting the Bee Gees and Andy Gibb on holiday at Miami Beach, was released.

The single peaked at No. 16 in the UK, and would be the last Top 40 hit the band had in the UK for almost eight years.

Personnel
Barry Gibb – lead and harmony vocals, acoustic guitar
Maurice Gibb – bass guitar, backing vocals
Robin Gibb – backing vocals
Herbie Mann – flute
Alan Kendall – acoustic guitar
Blue Weaver – keyboards, synthesizer
Joe Lala – percussion
Daniel Ben Zebulon – percussion

Chart performance

References

1979 singles
1979 songs
Bee Gees songs
Songs written by Barry Gibb
Songs written by Maurice Gibb
Songs written by Robin Gibb
RSO Records singles
Song recordings produced by Barry Gibb
Song recordings produced by Robin Gibb
Song recordings produced by Maurice Gibb